European route E 30 (E 30) is a west–east European route, running from Cork in Ireland to Omsk in Russia. In the Netherlands, the highway runs from Hook of Holland eastwards through The Hague, Utrecht, Amersfoort and Apeldoorn to the German border, near De Lutte.

The highway is maintained by Rijkswaterstaat.

Route description

History

Exit list

See also

References

External links

N
030
Motorways in Gelderland
Motorways in Overijssel
Motorways in South Holland
Motorways in Utrecht (province)
Transport in Rotterdam
Transport in The Hague
Transport in Utrecht (city)